Miguel Ángel Huerta Medina (born October 1, 1978) is a Mexican professional boxer. He's the former NABF, WBO Inter-Continental Lightweight and NBA Light Welterweight Champion.

Professional career
On October 19, 2002 Hector knocked out the veteran José Luis Soto Karass in a bout held at the Arena Mexico in Mexico City.

Huerta then upset Denmark's Allan Vester to win the NBA Light Welterweight title. In August 2007 he beat title contender Efren Hinojosa to capture the NABF Lightweight title.

Miguel would then go onto lose a fight with undefeated Mike Alvarado.

References

External links

Boxers from the State of Mexico
People from Ecatepec de Morelos
Welterweight boxers
1978 births
Living people
Mexican male boxers